Yala Peak is a mountain in the Langtang area in Nepal.

Location 
The Tsergo Ri giant landslide occurred close to Yala Peak.

This peak is considered as a trekking peak by the Nepal Mountaineering Association, and is a relatively simple, non-technical climb. The climbing of Yala Peak passes through the Langtang National Park. The flora and fauna of the peak and surrounding area consist of Rhododendron, Snow leopard, and Red panda. In its first leg, climbers choose to go to Kyanjin Monastery , a famous Buddhist pilgrimage place, to adjust to the altitude and climate. Once acclimatized, the climbers move towards the base camp at Yala Kharka .

References 

Mountains of the Bagmati Province
Five-thousanders of the Himalayas